is a private junior college in Fukagawa, Hokkaidō, Japan. It was established in 1966.

History 
 1966: Junior College was set up.
 1980: The Childcare department was set up.
 2000: Academic department of agricultural economics separated to academic department of management and economics and Environment farming.

Academic departments
 Childcare
 Management and economics
 Environment farming

See also 
 List of junior colleges in Japan

External links
  

Japanese junior colleges
Universities and colleges in Hokkaido
Fukagawa, Hokkaido
1966 establishments in Japan
Educational institutions established in 1966